Regat may refer to:

Régat, a commune in southwestern France
Romanian Old Kingdom, Regat in Romanian and German languages